Love is an unincorporated community in Swisher County, Texas, United States.

A scenic backroad leads from Happy to Love.

George E. Love was an early settler who in 1890 provided land for the establishment of one of the county's first schools.  "Love School" was central to many of this rural community's activities, including church services, Sunday school, and community gatherings.

References

Unincorporated communities in Swisher County, Texas
Unincorporated communities in Texas